Logi Tómasson (born 13 September 2000) is an Icelandic footballer who plays as a left-back for Víkingur Reykjavík and the Iceland national team.

Career
Logi has played his entire senior career with Víkingur Reykjavík apart from a loan spell in the second tier with Þróttur Reykjavík in 2018 and a loan spell in the top tier with FH in 2020.

International career
Logi made his international debut for Iceland on 6 November 2022 in a friendly match against Saudi Arabia.

Other
Logi published an album in 2019 under the artist name Luigi, with songs from the album making it to top Spotify charts in Iceland.

References

External links
 
 

2000 births
Living people
Logi Tomasson
Logi Tomasson
Logi Tomasson